Sigujana kaSenzangakhona (died 1816) was chief of the Zulu people in 1816. He was the son of Senzangakhona kaJama and half-brother of Dingane kaSenzangakhona and Shaka kaSenzangakhona. He succeeded his father  1816. His mother was Bhibhi kaSompisi. Shortly after he became chief, he was murdered by his half-brother, Shaka. It is disputed whether Shaka had him assassinated, or Shaka himself killed Sigujana by stabbing him. His birth date is unknown, but he died in 1816, shortly after he had become chief.

References 

Zulu kings
1816 deaths
19th-century Zulu people